Sangaris luctuosa is a species of beetle in the family Cerambycidae. It was described by Pascoe in 1859. It is known from Brazil.

References

luctuosa
Beetles described in 1859